Geraldine Leigh Chaplin (born July 31, 1944) is an American actress. She is a daughter of Charlie Chaplin, the first of eight children with his fourth wife, Oona O'Neill. After beginnings in dance and modeling, she turned her attention to acting, and made her English-language acting debut (and came to prominence in what would be a Golden Globe-nominated role) in her portrayal of Tonya in David Lean's Doctor Zhivago (1965). She made her Broadway acting debut in Lillian Hellman's The Little Foxes in 1967, and played the role of ancient Egyptian Queen Nefertiti in Raúl Araiza's Nefertiti and Akhenaton (1973) alongside famous Egyptian actor Salah Zulfikar. Chaplin received her second Golden Globe nomination for Robert Altman's Nashville (1975). She received a BAFTA nomination for her role in Welcome to L.A. (1976). She played her grandmother Hannah Chaplin in the biopic Chaplin (1992) for which she received her third Golden Globe nomination.

Chaplin has appeared in a wide variety of critically recognized Spanish and French films. She starred in Les Uns et les Autres (1981), Life Is a Bed of Roses (1983) and the Jacques Rivette experimental films Noroît (1976) and Love on the Ground (1984). She was the partner of director Carlos Saura for 12 years until 1979, starring in his films Ana and the Wolves (1973), Cría Cuervos (1976), Elisa, vida mía (1977), and Mamá cumple cien años (1979). She was awarded a Goya Award for her role in En la ciudad sin límites (2002), and was nominated again for The Orphanage (2007). Her contribution to Spanish cinema culminated in her being awarded the gold medal by the Spanish Academy of Cinematographic Arts and Sciences in 2006. In 2018, she starred in Red Land (Rosso Istria), Italian movie by Maximiliano Hernando Bruno based on Norma Cossetto and the foibe massacres. In 2019, she played the Duchess of Windsor in season 3 of the Netflix period drama series The Crown.

Early life and education
Geraldine Leigh Chaplin was born on July 31, 1944, in Santa Monica, California, the fourth child of actor and filmmaker Charlie Chaplin, and the first child of his fourth wife, Oona O'Neill, whom he married in 1943. Charlie Chaplin was 55 when Geraldine Chaplin was born and Oona was 19 years old. Geraldine was the first of their eight children. Her paternal grandparents were English Charles Chaplin Sr. and Hannah Chaplin (born Hannah Harriet Pedlingham Hill), and her maternal grandparents were Nobel- and Pulitzer-Prize-winning American playwright Eugene O'Neill and English-born writer Agnes Boulton.

When Geraldine was eight years old, her father took the family on vacation to Britain and Europe. Two days after the family set sail, the U.S. Attorney General James P. McGranery signed an order refusing Chaplin permission to re-enter the country. Chaplin's father moved the family to Switzerland. She attended boarding school there, where she became fluent in French and Spanish. Also in this time period, Geraldine appeared in her father's film Limelight (1952).

Career

Dance and modeling
At 17 years of age, she decided to forgo college to pursue dance instead, and studied ballet for two years in England, including a period in 1961 at the Royal Ballet School. She then danced professionally for a year in Paris. Although a good dancer, she felt she had not trained from an early enough age to excel at it and so gave up ballet. She said, "I didn't leave ballet, ballet left me". It was a great disappointment to her.

Geraldine then found work as a fashion model in Paris. She was then discovered by David Lean. It would be many years before she could bring herself to see a ballet performance.

Early acting, 1965–69
When her dream of becoming a ballet dancer ended, Chaplin followed her father into what was to become a prolific acting career. She came to prominence in the role of Tonya in David Lean's Doctor Zhivago (1965). David Lean chose her to play the main character's wife, for which she received a Golden Globe Award nomination in the category, "Most Promising Female Newcomer". In an interview to publicize the film, she explained, "Because of my name, the right doors opened."

In 1967, she made her Broadway debut in Lillian Hellman's The Little Foxes. Her performance was praised by Clive Barnes in a New York Times review, where he noted that Chaplin "acts with spirit and force… with a magnificently raw-voiced sincerity" giving a performance of "surprising power".

In the same year, she also began what would become a significant collaboration, starring in Spanish film director Carlos Saura's psychological thriller Peppermint Frappé (1967).

The Hawaiians through Cría Cuervos, 1970–79
Chaplin starred alongside Charlton Heston in the American historical film The Hawaiians (1970).
Chaplin then appeared in The Three Musketeers (1973), and Nefertiti y Aquenatos (1973) of Raúl Araiza in which she played the role of ancient Egyptian queen Nefertiti alongside Egyptian movie star Salah Zulfikar, as well as the sequel, The Four Musketeers (1974). Chaplin was cast as the obnoxious BBC reporter Opal in Robert Altman's Nashville (1975), for which she received her second Golden Globe nomination, for Best Supporting Actress. She went on to star in the Altman films Buffalo Bill and the Indians, or Sitting Bull's History Lesson (1976), and then A Wedding (1978), doing Roseland (1977) in between.Chaplin later occasionally co-wrote scripts for and starred in several later Saura films—for these, receiving her greatest critical success—such as Ana and the Wolves (1973), Cría Cuervos (1976), Elisa, vida mía (1977) and Mamá cumple cien años (1979). Cría Cuervos won the Special Jury Prize Award at the 1976 Cannes Film Festival. Critic Vincent Canby praised Chaplin's "superb" performance.

Chaplin starred in several films produced by Altman and directed by Alan Rudolph, with a BAFTA-nominated role in Welcome to L.A. (1976), in which she played a housewife addicted to cab rides. She received critical acclaim for her role in Remember My Name (1978), in which she played Anthony Perkins' murderous estranged wife.

In an interview with The New York Times in 1977, Chaplin cited that her career was going more successfully in Europe than in the United States. She complained that "I only seem to work with Altman here ... I don't have any offers in this country, none. Not even an interesting script to read. The only person who ever asks me is Altman—and James Ivory."

French-language and other roles, 1980–89

In the 1980s, Chaplin starred in several French-language roles, including Claude Lelouch's Les Uns et les Autres (1981), Alain Resnais' Life Is a Bed of Roses (1983), Jacques Rivette's experimental Love on the Ground (1984), and then the American film, I Want to Go Home (1989).

Chaplin also starred in Rudolph's 1920s-set film, The Moderns (1988).

Chaplin, Scorsese, and Zeffirelli, 1990–99
In the biographical film about her father, Chaplin (1992), she played her grandmother Hannah Chaplin, for which she was nominated for her third Golden Globe Award. Soon after, she was directed by Martin Scorsese in The Age of Innocence (1993), and appeared in Franco Zeffirelli's version of Jane Eyre (1996).

Chaplin went on to appear in Mother Teresa: In the Name of God's Poor (1997).

The Spanish period, 2000–present

Chaplin received a Goya Mejor Actriz de Reparto for her role in Spanish-Argentine thriller En la ciudad sin límites (In the City Without Limits, 2002). Other notable Spanish films she collaborated with and appeared in Pedro Almodóvar's Talk to Her (2002), and Juan Antonio Bayona's The Orphanage (2007), for which she received a second Goya Award nomination. She also starred in the Catalan drama, The Mosquito Net (2010), for which she was awarded the Crystal Globe.

In 2006 Chaplin was awarded the gold medal by the Academia de las Artes y las Ciencias Cinematográficas de España—the Spanish Academy of Cinematographic Arts and Sciences—for her contribution to Spanish cinema.

Chaplin appeared in The Wolfman, in 2010.

In Americano, she appeared with Salma Hayek, and featured with Jane Fonda in All Together (both 2011). She reunited with Juan Antonio Bayona for the films The Impossible (2012), A Monster Calls (2016) and Jurassic World: Fallen Kingdom (2018). Chaplin received the Best Actress Award at the Havana Film Festival for her role in the Dominican Republic film Sand Dollars (2014).

In 2018, she starred in Red Land (Rosso Istria), an Italian movie by Maximiliano Hernando Bruno based on Norma Cossetto and the foibe massacres.

In 2022, she appeared in the music video for the song "Pure" by Swiss artist, Gjon’s Tears.

Personal life

Chaplin's son, Shane Saura Chaplin, was born in 1974. His father is Spanish film director Carlos Saura, who directed several films Chaplin appeared in. 

Chaplin's daughter, Oona, is now an actress in British and Spanish films. Chaplin married Oona's father, Chilean cinematographer Patricio Castilla, in 2006. 

In 1978, the Chaplin family were the victims of a failed extortion plot by kidnappers who had stolen the body of Charlie Chaplin. Geraldine Chaplin negotiated with the kidnappers, who had also threatened her infant son.

, Chaplin has maintained a home in Miami. She also was spending time in residences between Madrid and Corsier-sur-Vevey, Switzerland (the latter near the former long-time home of her parents).

Filmography

Film

Television

References

External links

1944 births
Living people
American film actresses
American people of British descent
American people of Irish descent
American people of English descent
American television actresses
Best Supporting Actress Goya Award winners
Actresses from Santa Monica, California
Geraldine
20th-century American actresses
21st-century American actresses
American expatriates in Spain
American expatriates in Switzerland
American expatriates in France